Andrea Poli (born 29 September 1989) is an Italian footballer who plays as a midfielder for  club Modena.

Club career

Treviso 
He started his career in Serie B with his native club Treviso. He made his professional debut aged just 17 years, 2 months and 10 days under manager Ezio Rossi, in a 3–2 loss against Genoa C.F.C. on 9 December 2006. On 31 January 2007, he was signed by Serie A club Sampdoria in a joint ownership deal, but immediately loaned back to Treviso until officially becoming a member of Sampdoria at the end of the season. He made three further appearances for Treviso during the 2006–07 season.

Sampdoria 

On 4 November 2007, he made his Serie A debut for Sampdoria in a 0–3 away win against Cagliari, under manager Walter Mazzarri, aged 18 years, 1 month and 6 days. Andrea also made the bench on six other occasions in the 2007–08 season. He was also part of the Primaverasquad that won the Campionato Nazionale Primavera.

In the 2008–09 season he was loaned out to the Serie B club Sassuolo in order to gain experience. At Sassuolo he had a breakout season, making 33 appearances between the Coppa Italia and Serie B and managed five goals and three assists. A season highlight was scoring both of Sassuolo's goals against U.S. Grosseto F.C. in a 2–1 away win. During the season Andrea was also part of Italy's u19, u20 and u21 youth sides.

Upon his return to Sampdoria in the summer of 2009 he became a key player of the side that ended 4th in the league. He made 32 appearances playing as a central midfield playmaker and managed three assists. The next season Poli played less due to injuries and lack of form in Sampdoria side that endured a disastrous season. The side were knocked out of UEFA Champions League qualifying by SV Werder Bremen, were knocked out of the Europa League at the group stage and were eventually relegated from Serie A, finishing fourteen places lower than they did the last season.

Inter Milan 
On 29 August 2011, Poli joined Internazionale on a season-long loan, with Inter having the option to buy him permanently in 2012. After missing most of the first half of the season through injury, Andrea had a very strong second half to the season and made 21 appearances for the Italian giants. Poli scored his first Inter goal in the Coppa Italia match against Genoa in a 2–1 win on 19 January 2012. He also made his UEFA Champions League proper debut against Olympique de Marseille. Despite his good performances for the Nerazzuri, Internazionale did not take up their buy option on the player and so he returned to Sampdoria.

Andrea returned to Sampdoria who were back in Serie A after just one season in Serie B. He made 32 appearances in the 2012–13 season scoring a career high three goals.

AC Milan 
On 8 July 2013, Poli joined AC Milan becoming their third signing of summer 2013 for €3 million (€1.4 million plus 50% rights of Bartosz Salamon) in a co-ownership deal. Andrea made 37 appearances in all competitions in his first season with the Rossoneri. He managed two goals and four assists in what was a promising start to his Milan career. He was purchased outright by Milan on 9 June 2014.

Bologna 
On 1 July 2017, he permanently joined Bologna by signing a four-year contract.
The new four-year contract is worth €800,000 net per season.

On 15 October he signed his first goal for the rossoblu, in the 2–1 against SPAL .

Antalyaspor 
On 23 July 2021, Poli signed a three-year deal with Turkish Süper Lig club Antalyaspor.

Modena 
On 29 September 2022, Poli joined Modena in Serie B for the 2022–23 season.

International career
Poli was in the squad at the 2008 U-19 European Championships, where he scored two goals in the first round.

On 11 February 2009, he made his debut with the Italy U-21 squad in a 1–1 friendly draw against Sweden, played at the Stadio Nereo Rocco in Trieste. He was called up by manager Pierluigi Casiraghi for the 2009 European Championships in the summer, but did not make an appearance, as Italy reached the semi-finals, only to be eliminated 1–0 by eventual champions Germany. He scored his first goal for the under-21 side later that year, on 8 September, in a 2–0 home win over Luxembourg, in a Euro 2011 qualifier.

After being given his first senior international call-up by Cesare Prandelli on 10 August 2012, Poli made his debut with the Italian senior team on 15 August, coming on for Alberto Aquilani in the second half of a 2–1 friendly loss to England. On 31 May 2013, he scored his first goal with the national team, in a 4–0 friendly win against San Marino, in Bologna. Poli was initially included in Italy's 31-man preliminary squad for the 2013 FIFA Confederations Cup, but excluded from the final 23-man squad.

Style of play 
Poli mainly operates as an offensive-minded central midfielder, known as the "mezzala" role, in Italy, due to his ability to assist his team both offensively and defensively, although he can also be deployed as an attacking midfielder, or even as a defensive midfielder in front of the back-line; he has also been fielded as a full-back on occasion. He has been described as a versatile, energetic player, with good technical and creative qualities, which make him capable of starting attacking plays after winning back the ball. He also possesses an eye for goal due to his accurate striking ability from distance. He has been praised for his stamina, work-rate, and ability to read the game, as well as his tactical intelligence and discipline. Poli has been compared to Daniele De Rossi, and he has cited Andrea Pirlo, Frank Lampard, and Steven Gerrard as his role models, with the main focus on the latter.

Career statistics

Club

International

Honours

Club 
AC Milan
 Supercoppa Italiana: 2016

Italy U21
UEFA European Under-21 Championship bronze: 2009

References

External links 

 
 

1989 births
People from Vittorio Veneto
Footballers from Veneto
Sportspeople from the Province of Treviso
Living people
Association football midfielders
Italian footballers
Italy youth international footballers
Italy under-21 international footballers
Treviso F.B.C. 1993 players
U.C. Sampdoria players
U.S. Sassuolo Calcio players
Inter Milan players
A.C. Milan players
Bologna F.C. 1909 players
Antalyaspor footballers
Modena F.C. 2018 players
Serie A players
Serie B players
Süper Lig players
Italian expatriate sportspeople in Turkey
Italian expatriate footballers
Italy international footballers